Shah Rag (also Romanized as Shāh Rag and Shāhrg) is a village in Dowlatkhaneh Rural District, Bajgiran District, Quchan County, Razavi Khorasan Province, Iran. At the 2006 census, its population was 747, in 202 families.

References 

Populated places in Quchan County